San Fernando is a partido of Buenos Aires Province, Argentina, in the north of Greater Buenos Aires. Its capital is San Fernando. It is twenty-eight kilometers from the city of Buenos Aires.

Population distribution (2010)
Of the 163,240 inhabitants recorded in the 2010 census, the distribution is:
San Fernando: 76,726
Victoria: 44,959
Virreyes: 38,599
Paraná Delta islands: 2,956

References

External links 

  

 
Partidos of Buenos Aires Province
States and territories established in 1805
1805 establishments in the Spanish Empire